Shurab (also Romanized as Shūrāb) is a village in Shurab Rural District, in the Central District of Arsanjan County, Fars Province, Iran. At the 2006 census, its population was 765, in 171 families.

References 

Populated places in Arsanjan County